The oldest line of  is probably the school founded by Nakamura Sakyōdayū Yoshikuni around 1610, and is often referred to as . This line has a historical connection to the Takeda family through the founder's grandfather, Nakamura Yorifusa. Yorifusa was a retainer of the Koshu Takeda who founded a school of jujutsu called Taiyo ryu. Yoshin Koryu was founded by Nakamura Yoshikuni in Nagasaki after being driven from Takeda lands by Tokugawa Ieyasu. It is stated that Yoshin Koryu was a mixture of Taiyo ryu and knowledge gained by Yoshikuni’s exposure to Chinese martial arts and medicine, knowledge gained while living in Nagasaki and in nearby Miura village.

History

An area of confusion concerning this school is its founding in Nagasaki, where the more ubiquitous school using the name of Yōshin-ryū (Akiyama line) and another school named Miura ryu was founded. This other Miura ryu was founded by Miura Yojuiemon of the Fukuno ryu jujutsu lineages. This school was reportedly influenced by the Chinese martial artist and scholar, Chin Genpin. It is possible there was cross pollination between all these schools that all reportedly were in existence in Nagasaki in the first half of the 17th century.  

This school survived 11 generations. The last fully licensed actively teaching instructor of Yoshin Koryu ryu jujutsu was Kanaya Motoyoshi who died in the early 20th century. With his death the Yoshin Koryu jujutsu school lost transmission and no longer exists. Densho were apparently passed on to a 12th generation headmaster but the waza are no longer practiced.

The various names used for this school:

Yoshin Koryu, Miura Yoshin ryu, Miura ryu, Yoshin ryu, and Totsuka ha Yoshin ryu.

Schools influenced by Yoshin Koryu:

Tenshin Yoshin ryu, Shindo Yoshin ryu, Takamura ha Shindo Yoshin ryu, and Kodokan Judo.

References 

Ko-ryū bujutsu